Con O'Brien may refer to:
 Con O'Brien (American football) (1898–1993), American football player
 Con O'Brien (politician) (1866–1938), Australian politician